The 1980 Miami Dolphins season was the 15th year of existence for the Miami Dolphins franchise. Quarterback Bob Griese retired after the season, following a 14-year career with the Dolphins. However, in Griese's final season the Dolphins would only play mediocre football finishing in third place with an 8-8 record. This was also the first season since 1969 that the Dolphins lost to the Buffalo Bills. For the season, the Dolphins converted from gray facemasks to teal facemasks.

The Dolphins failed to have a pro bowler for the 2nd straight season.

Offseason

NFL draft

Personnel

Staff

Roster

Regular season 
The 1980 NFL season would see the Dolphins drop to an 8–8 record, from their AFC East division winning 10–6 showing the previous year.

Quarterback Bob Griese, who struggled with leg problems during 1979, lost the starting job to longtime backup Don Strock, but he did poorly in two games, leading the Dolphins to return to Griese for Week 3. In Week 5, however, Griese suffered a career-ending shoulder injury against the Baltimore Colts and was succeeded by David Woodley, a rookie fresh from LSU.

Their week 1 loss to the Buffalo Bills was the Dolphins' first loss to that team since 1969, snapping a 20 game winning streak for Miami in the Bills-Dolphins rivalry. After the win, Bills fans rushed the field and tore down the goalposts. This was also Don Shula's first loss to Buffalo in 21 career games against them.

The final game of the season was played against the New York Jets on December 20. NBC tried a novel experiment by broadcasting the game with no commentators, and with none of the players or staff wearing microphones. The effect was to give television viewers the feel of actually being in the stadium. To date, this was the only NFL game ever aired on TV without commentaries. The Jets won by a score of 24–17, though both teams had already been eliminated from playoff contention.

It was during the ABC broadcast of the Monday Night Football game on December 8, 1980, against the Patriots that Howard Cosell announced that John Lennon had been shot and killed.

Schedule 

Note: Intra-division opponents are in bold text.

Game summaries

Week 1 at Bills

Week 7 vs Bills

Week 14: vs. New England Patriots 

 Source: Pro-Football-Reference.com
    
    
    
    
    
    
    

The Dolphins got revenge from their 34-0 shellacking in Foxborough back in October. The Patriots clawed to a 13–6 lead in the fourth quarter, then the Dolphins forced overtime with a David Woodley throw to Nat Moore in the fourth. John Smith attempted to kick the game-winning field goal, but had the kick blocked, then Uwe von Schamann of the Dolphins won it with a 23-yard field goal in the extra quarter. The game, though, became overshadowed by Howard Cosell's announcement that John Lennon had been shot and killed.

Standings

References

External links 
 1980 Miami Dolphins at Pro-Football-Reference.com

Miami
Miami Dolphins seasons
Miami Dolphins